A Place Called Love Land is the fourth studio album by American recording artist Raheem DeVaughn. The album was released on September 3, 2013, by Mass Appeal Entertainment, INgrooves and Fontana Distribution.

Singles
The first single "Love Connection" was released on February 14, 2013. On April 16, 2013, the music video was released for "Love Connection".

Critical response

A Place Called Love Land was met with generally positive reviews from music critics. Andy Kellman of AllMusic gave the album four out of five stars, saying "No matter how boastful DeVaughn gets, a listener can feel as if she's being addressed directly pretty much all the way through. Even when DeVaughn sings 'On the phone saying I love her, but in the bathroom there's another,' as he does on 'Wrong Forever,' it's done as repentance. It's surprising that the newly independent DeVaughn, whose transition to a smaller budget is sonically transparent, doesn't let loose with some freewheeling funk like 'Lose Control.' That said, the throbbing 'Love Connection,' released as a single several months prior to the album, is his best uptempo song, as well as one of his catchiest concoctions. It didn't gain traction with radio -- a major shame." Joe Warminsky of the Washington City Paper gave the album a positive review, saying "For anybody who was particularly jazzed by DeVaughn’s pre-election, let’s-march-then-ball-all-night vibe, the album might seem a little lightweight. But it’s a logical career move, a way to get back to basics while adjusting to the freedom that his new deal is said to offer him. The squishier passages—which never really cross into X-rated territory, perhaps because DeVaughn has the mass market in mind—are simply reminders that R&B should serve every facet of a relationship, even the foot rubs."

Commercial performance
The album debuted and peaked at number 22 on the US Billboard 200 chart.

Track listing

Charts

Weekly charts

Year-end charts

References

2013 albums
Raheem DeVaughn albums